Marcel Wendelin (born 14 June 1939) is a German sprinter. He competed in the men's 200 metres at the 1960 Summer Olympics.

References

1939 births
Living people
Athletes (track and field) at the 1960 Summer Olympics
German male sprinters
Olympic athletes of the United Team of Germany
Place of birth missing (living people)